Andy Cabic is a folk rock singer-songwriter, and lead member of the band Vetiver.

He was born in Virginia and attended school at the University of North Carolina Greensboro. He moved to San Francisco in 1998.

He is a longtime collaborator of Devendra Banhart, having co-written songs and produced Banhart's album Cripple Crow. He was also at one time a member of the experimental electronic band Tussle.

In 2011, Cabic appeared on former Cardinals guitarist Neal Casal's studio album, Sweeten the Distance.

Cabic co-produced Sarah Lee Guthrie & Johnny Irion album Bright Examples with Thom Monahan.

References

External links
Interview with Andy Cabic
Andy Cabic's Mixtape: "A Grab Bag of Goodies"

Living people
Psychedelic folk musicians
American folk musicians
Year of birth missing (living people)
University of North Carolina at Greensboro alumni